North American moths represent about 12,000 types of moths. In comparison, there are about 825 species of North American butterflies. The moths (mostly nocturnal) and butterflies (mostly diurnal) together make up the taxonomic order Lepidoptera.

This list is sorted by MONA number (MONA is short for Moths of America North of Mexico). A numbering system for North American moths introduced by Ronald W. Hodges, et al. in 1983 in the publication Check List of the Lepidoptera of America North of Mexico. The list has since been updated, but the placement in families is outdated for some species.

This list covers America north of Mexico (effectively the continental United States and Canada). For a list of moths and butterflies recorded from the state of Hawaii, see List of Lepidoptera of Hawaii.

This is a partial list, covering moths with MONA numbers ranging from 4618 to 5509. For the rest of the list, see List of moths of North America.

Zygaenidae
4618 – Harrisina aversa
4619 – Harrisina cyanea
4620 – Harrisina lustrans
4621 – Harrisina brillians
4622 – Harrisina coracina
4623 – Harrisina metallica, western grapeleaf skeletonizer moth
4624 – Harrisina americana, grapeleaf skeletonizer moth
4625 – Neoalbertia basirei
4626 – Neoalbertia constans
4626.1 – Neoalbertia rata
4627 – Acoloithus rectarius, upright acoloithus moth
4628 – Acoloithus novaricus
4629 – Acoloithus falsarius, Clemens' false skeletonizer moth
4630 – Triprocris yampai
4630.1 – Triprocris cyanea
4631 – Triprocris smithsoniana
4631.1 – Neoprocris prunivora
4631.2 – Neoprocris floridana
4632 – Tetraclonia dyari
4633 – Tetraclonia latercula
4634 – Neoilliberis martenii
4634.1 – Neoilliberis kendalli
4634.2 – Neoilliberis arizonica
4635 – Neoilliberis fusca
4636 – Pyromorpha rata
4637 – Pyromorpha centralis
4638 – Pyromorpha caelebs
4639 – Pyromorpha dimidiata, orange-patched smoky moth
4639.1 – Pryeria sinica, euonymous defoliator moth

Megalopygidae
4640 – Trosia obsolescens
4641 – Lagoa immaculata
4642 – Lagoa pyxidifera, yellow flannel moth
4643 – Lagoa lacyi, Florida flannel moth
4644 – Lagoa crispata, black-waved flannel moth
4645 – Megalopyge lapena
4646 – Megalopyge bissesa
4647 – Megalopyge opercularis, southern flannel moth
4648 – Norape tenera, mesquite stinger moth
4649 – Norape virgo
4650 – Norape ovina, white flannel moth

Limacodidae and Dalceridae
4651 – Paleophobetron perornata
4651.1 – Euprosterna lacipea
4652 – Tortricidia testacea, early button slug moth
4653 – Tortricidia pallida, red-crossed button slug moth
4654 – Tortricidia flexuosa, abbreviated button slug moth
4655 – Slossonella tenebrosa
4656 – Kronaea minuta
4657 – Heterogenea shurtleffi, red-eyed button slug moth
4658 – Packardia albipunctata
4659 – Packardia geminata, jeweled tailed slug moth
4660 – Packardia ceanothi
4661 – Packardia elegans, elegant tailed slug moth
4662 – Lithacodes graefii
4663 – Lithacodes fiskeanus
4664 – Lithacodes gracea, graceful slug moth
4665 – Lithacodes fasciola, yellow-shouldered slug moth
4666 – Apoda biguttata
4667 – Apoda y-inversum, yellow-collared slug moth
4668 – Apoda rectilinea, rectilinea slug moth
4668.1 – Apoda latomia, western rectilinea slug moth
4669 – Apoda biguttata, shagreened slug moth
4670 – Prolimacodes trigona, western skiff moth
4671 – Prolimacodes badia, skiff moth
4672 – Cnidocampa flavescens
4673 – Alarodia slossoniae, Packard's white flannel moth
4674 – Cryptophobetron oropeso, ocotillo slug moth
4675 – Isochaetes beutenmuelleri, spun glass slug moth
4676 – Phobetron dyari
4677 – Phobetron pithecium, hag [monkey slug] moth
4678 – Natada nigripuncta
4679 – Natada nasoni, Nason's slug moth
4680 – Isa schaefferana
4681 – Isa textula, crowned slug moth
4682 – Adoneta gemina
4683 – Adoneta pygmaea
4684 – Adoneta bicaudata
4685 – Adoneta spinuloides, purple-crested slug moth
4686 – Monoleuca disconcolorata
4687 – Monoleuca fieldi
4688 – Monoleuca occidentalis
4689 – Monoleuca erectifascia
4690 – Monoleuca obliqua
4691 – Monoleuca semifascia, pin-striped vermilion slug moth
4692 – Monoleuca angustilinea
4693 – Monoleuca subdentosa
4694 – Euclea dolliana
4695 – Euclea flava
4696 – Euclea incisa
4697 – Euclea delphinii, spiny oak-slug moth
4697.1 – Euclea nanina, nanina oak-slug moth
4698 – Parasa chloris, smaller parasa moth
4699 – Parasa indetermina, stinging rose caterpillar moth
4700 – Acharia stimulea, saddleback caterpillar moth
4700.1 – Acharia extensa
4701 – Fulgoraecia exigua, planthopper parasite moth
4702 – Dalcerides ingenitus

Crambidae
4703 – Gesneria centuriella
4704 – Gesneria rindgeorum
4705 – Cosipara tricoloralis, tricolored cosipara moth
4706 W – Cosipara modulalis
4707 – Cosipara chiricahuae
4708 – Scoparia rigidalis
4709 – Scoparia denigata
4710 W – Scoparia normalis
4711 W – Scoparia palloralis
4712 – Scoparia californialis
4713 – Scoparia apachealis
4714 – Scoparia ruidosalis
4715 – Scoparia blanchardi
4716 – Scoparia biplagialis, double-striped scoparia moth
4717 – Scoparia penumbralis, dark-brown scoparia moth
4718 – Scoparia cinereomedia
4719 – Scoparia basalis, many-spotted scoparia moth
4720 – Scoparia dominicki
4721 – Scoparia huachucalis
4722 W – Eudonia rectilinea
4723 W – Eudonia commortalis
4724 – Eudonia expallidalis
4725 – Eudonia franciscalis
4726 W – Eudonia torniplagalis
4727 W – Eudonia albertalis
4728 – Eudonia vivida
4729 W – Eudonia spaldingalis
4730 W – Eudonia spenceri
4731 – Eudonia rotundalis
4732 – Eudonia franclemonti
4733 – Eudonia schwarzalis
4734 – Eudonia leucophthalma
4735 W – Eudonia echo
4736 – Eudonia bronzalis
4737 – Eudonia lugubralis
4738 – Eudonia strigalis, striped eudonia moth
4739 – Eudonia heterosalis
4740 – Undulambia striatalis
4741 – Undulambia polystichalis, leatherleaf fern borer moth
4742 – Undulambia rarissima
4743 – Neocataclysta magnificalis, scrollwork pyralid moth
4744 – Chrysendeton medicinalis, bold medicine moth
4745 – Chrysendeton kimballi
4746 – Chrysendeton imitabilis
4746.1 – Chrysendeton nigrescens
4747 – Nymphula ekthlipsis, nymphula moth
4748 – Elophila icciusalis, pondside pyralid moth
4749 – Elophila faulalis
4750 – Elophila nebulosalis, nebulous munroessa moth
4751 – Elophila gyralis, waterlily borer moth
4752 – Contiger vittatalis
4753 – Nymphuliella daeckealis, china mark moth
4754 – Synclita tinealis
4755 – Synclita obliteralis, waterlily leafcutter moth
4756 – Synclita atlantica
4757 – Synclita occidentalis
4758 – Langessa nomophilalis, black langessa moth
4759 – Parapoynx maculalis, polymorphic pondweed moth
4760 – Parapoynx obscuralis, obscure pondweed moth
4761 – Parapoynx badiusalis, chestnut-marked pondweed moth
4762 – Parapoynx curviferalis
4763 – Parapoynx seminealis, floating-heart waterlilly moth
4764 – Parapoynx allionealis, watermilfoil leafcutter moth
4765 – Parapoynx diminutalis, hydrilla leafcutter moth
4767 – Usingeriessa onyxalis
4768 – Usingeriessa brunnildalis
4769 – Neargyractis slossonalis, dimorphic leafcutter moth
4770 – Petrophila drumalis
4771 W – Petrophila daemonalis
4772 – Petrophila cappsi
4773 W – Petrophila kearfottalis
4774 – Petrophila bifascialis, two-banded petrophila moth
4775 W – Petrophila jaliscalis
4776 – Petrophila hodgesi
4777 – Petrophila fulicalis
4778 – Petrophila santafealis
4779 – Petrophila canadensis, Canadian petrophila moth
4780 – Petrophila confusalis, confusing petrophila moth
4781 W – Petrophila avernalis
4782 – Petrophila cronialis
4783 – Petrophila longipennis
4784 W – Petrophila schaefferalis
4784.1 – Petrophila heppneri
4785 – Eoparargyractis irroratalis
4786 – Eoparargyractis floridalis
4787 – Eoparargyractis plevie
4788 – Oxyelophila callista
4789 – Metrea ostreonalis, oystershell metrea moth
4790 – Dichogama redtenbacheri, caper-leaf webworm moth
4791 – Dichogama amabilis
4792 – Dichogama colotha
4793 – Alatuncusia bergii, Berg's alatuncusia moth
4794 – Eustixia pupula, spotted peppergrass moth
4795 W – Microtheoris vibicalis, whip-marked snout moth
4796 – Microtheoris ophionalis, yellow-veined moth
4797 – Rhodocantha diagonalis
4798 W – Freschinia helianthiales
4799 – Freschinia lutosalis
4800 – Freschinia laetalis
4801 – Freschinia criddlealis
4802 – Freschinia texanalis
4803 W – Procymbopteryx belialis
4804 – Cymbopteryx fuscimarginalis
4805 – Cymbopteryx unilinealis
4806 – Neocymbopteryx heitzmani
4807 W – Edia semiluna
4808 – Edia minutissima
4809 W – Dichozoma parvipicta
4810 – Cuneifrons coloradensis
4811 – Gyros muirii
4812 – Gyros atripennalis
4813 – Gyros powelli
4814 – Anatralata versicolor
4815 – Eremanthe chemsaki
4816 – Metaxmeste nubicola
4817 – Pogonogenys proximalis
4818 – Pogonogenys frechini
4819 – Pogonogenys masoni
4820 – Chrismania pictipennalis
4821 – Plumipalpiella martini
4822 – Nannobotys commortalis
4823 – Porphyrorhegma fortunata
4824 – Psammobotys fordi
4825 – Psammobotys alpinalis
4826 – Mimoschinia rufofascialis, rufous-banded crambid moth
4827 W – Jativa castanealis
4828 – Pseudoschinia elautalis
4829 – Odontivalvia radialis
4830 – Noctueliopsis brunnealis
4831 W – Noctueliopsis puertalis
4832 – Noctueliopsis palmalis
4833 – Noctueliopsis atascaderalis
4834 – Noctueliopsis aridalis
4835 – Noctueliopsis pandoralis
4836 – Noctueliopsis rhodoxanthinalis
4837 W – Noctueliopsis bububattalis
4838 W – Noctueliopsis virula
4839 W – Mojavia achemonalis
4840 – Mojaviodes blanchardae
4841 – Heliothelopsis arbutalis
4842 – Heliothelopsis costipunctalis
4843 – Heliothelopsis unicoloralis
4844 – Chlorobaptella rufistrigalis
4845 – Glaucodontia pyraustoides
4846 – Hellula rogatalis, cabbage webworm moth
4847 – Hellula phidilealis, cabbage budworm moth
4848 – Hellula kempae, Kemp's hellula moth
4849 W – Hellula aqualis
4850 – Hellula subbasalis
4851 – Upiga virescens
4852 – Paregesta californiensis
4853 – Scybalistodes periculosalis
4854 – Scybalistodes vermiculalis
4855 – Scybalistodes regularis
4856 – Scybalistodes fortis
4857 – Nephrogramma reniculalis
4858 – Nephrogramma separata
4859 – Stegea mexicana
4860 – Stegea sola
4861 – Stegea simplicialis
4862 – Stegea minutalis
4863 – Stegea powelli
4864 – Stegea eripalis
4865 W – Stegea salutalis
4866 – Abegesta reluctalis
4867 – Abegesta remellalis, white-trimmed brown pyralid moth
4868 – Abegesta concha
4869 – Glaphyria glaphyralis, common glaphyria moth
4870 – Glaphyria sequistrialis, white-roped glaphyria moth
4871 – Glaphyria basiflavalis, basal-dash glaphyria moth
4872 – Glaphyria peremptalis
4873 – Glaphyria fulminalis, black-patched glaphyria moth
4874 – Glaphyria cappsi
4875 – Aethiophysa delicata
4876 – Aethiophysa dualis
4877 – Aethiophysa lentiflualis
4878 – Aethiophysa consimilis
4879 – Xanthophysa psychialis, xanthophysa moth
4880 – Plumegesta largalis
4881 – Lipocosma sicalis
4882 – Lipocosma diabata
4883 – Lipocosma adelalis
4884 – Lipocosma intermedialis
4885 – Lipocosma septa, exposed lipocosma moth
4886 – Lipocosma albinibasalis
4887 – Lipocosma polingi
4888 – Lipocosmodes fuliginosalis, sooty lipocosmodes moth
4889 – Dicymolomia julianalis, Julia's dicymolomia moth
4890 – Dicymolomia metalophota
4891 – Dicymolomia opuntialis
4892 W – Dicymolomia metalliferalis
4893 – Dicymolomia grisea
4894 – Dicymolomia micropunctalis
4895 – Chalcoela iphitalis, sooty-winged chalcoela moth
4896 – Chalcoela pegasalis, wasp parasitizer moth
4896.5 – Neomusotima conspurcatalis, lygodium defoliator moth
4897 – Evergestis pallidata, purple-backed cabbageworm moth
4898 – Evergestis rimosalis, cross-striped cabbageworm moth
4899 W – Evergestis consimilis
4900 – Evergestis aridalis
4901 – Evergestis unimacula, large-spotted evergestis moth
4902 W – Evergestis lunulalis
4903 – Evergestis nolentis
4904 W – Evergestis simulatilis
4905 – Evergestis angustalis
4906 W – Evergestis vinctalis
4907 – Evergestis palousalis
4908 – Evergestis comstocki
4909 W – Evergestis funalis
4910 W – Evergestis subterminalis
4911 – Evergestis eurekalis
4912 W – Evergestis obliqualis
4913 – Evergestis dischematalis
4914 – Evergestis triangulalis
4915 – Evergestis borregalis
4916 – Prorasea simalis
4917 – Prorasea gracealis
4918 W – Prorasea praeia
4919 – Prorasea fernaldi
4920 – Prorasea sideralis
4921 – Prorasea pulveralis
4922 W – Cornifrons actualis
4923 – Cornifrons phasma
4924 – Cylindrifrons succandidalis
4925 – Orenaia trivialis
4926 – Orenaia coloradalis
4927 – Orenaia arcticalis
4928 – Orenaia sierralis
4929 – Orenaia alticolalis
4930 – Orenaia pallidivittalis
4931 W – Orenaia macneilli
4932 – Evergestella evincalis
4933 – Trischistognatha pyrenealis
4934 – Munroeodes thalesalis
4935 – Saucrobotys fumoferalis, dusky saucrobotys moth
4936 – Saucrobotys futilalis, dogbane saucrobotys moth
4937 – Nascia acutella, streaked orange moth
4938 – Epicorsia oedipodalis
4939 – Pseudopyrausta santatalis
4939.1 – Pseudopyrausta marginalis
4940 – Oenobotys vinotinctalis, wine-tinted oenobotys moth
4941 – Oenobotys texanalis
4942 – Triuncidia eupalusalis
4943 – Crocidophora pustuliferalis
4944 – Crocidophora serratissimalis, angelic crocidiphora moth
4945 – Crocidophora tuberculalis, pale-winged crocidiphora moth
4946 – Ostrinia penitalis, American lotus borer moth
4947 – Ostrinia obumbratalis, smartweed borer moth
4948 – Ostrinia marginalis
4949 – Ostrinia nubilalis, European corn borer moth
4950 – Fumibotys fumalis, mint root borer moth
4951 – Perispasta caeculalis, Titian Peale's pyralid moth
4952 – Eurrhypara hortulata, small magpie moth
4953 – Phlyctaenia coronata, crowned phlyctaenia moth
4954 – Phlyctaenia quebecensis, Quebec phlyctaenia moth
4955 – Phlyctaenia leuschneri
4956 – Nealgedonia extricalis
4957 – Algedonia mysippusalis
4958 – Anania funebris, white-spotted sable moth
4959 W – Anania labeculalis
4960 – Hahncappsia fordi
4961 – Hahncappsia alpinensis
4962 – Hahncappsia marculenta
4963 – Hahncappsia neomarculenta
4964 – Hahncappsia pseudobliteralis
4965 – Hahncappsia neobliteralis
4966 W – Hahncappsia jaralis
4967 – Hahncappsia mancalis
4968 – Hahncappsia pergilvalis
4969 – Hahncappsia cochisensis
4970 W – Hahncappsia coloradensis
4971 – Hahncappsia ramsdenalis
4972 – Hahncappsia huachucalis
4973 – Hahncappsia mellinialis
4973.1 E – Ecpyrrhoerrhoe puralis
4974 – Achyra bifidalis
4975 – Achyra rantalis, garden webworm moth
4976 W – Achyra occidentalis
4977 – Neohelvibotys neohelvialis
4978 W – Neohelvibotys arizonensis
4979 – Neohelvibotys polingi
4980 – Helvibotys helvialis
4981 – Helvibotys pseudohelvialis
4982 – Helvibotys freemani
4983 – Helvibotys subcostalis
4984 – Helvibotys pucilla
4985 – Sitochroa aureolalis
4986 – Sitochroa dasconalis
4986.1 – Sitochroa palealis, greenish-yellow sitochroa moth
4987 – Sitochroa chortalis, dimorphic sitochroa moth
4988 – Arenochroa flavalis
4989 – Xanthostege roseiterminalis
4990 – Xanthostege plana
4991 – Sericoplaga externalis
4992 – Uresiphita reversalis, genista broom moth
4993 W – Loxostege albiceralis
4994 – Loxostege floridalis, Christmas-berry webworm moth
4995 – Loxostege lepidalis
4996 – Loxostege indentalis
4997 – Loxostege kearfottalis
4998 – Loxostege terpnalis
4999 – Loxostege unicoloralis
5000 – Loxostege allectalis
5001 – Loxostege typhonalis
5002 W – Loxostege oberthuralis
5003 W – Loxostege egregialis
5004 – Loxostege sticticalis, beet webworm moth
5005 – Loxostege mojavealis
5006 W – Loxostege kingi
5007 – Loxostege annaphilalis
5008 – Loxostege immerens
5009 – Loxostege quaestoralis
5010 – Loxostege anartalis
5011 – Loxostege ephippialis
5012 – Loxostege thrallophilalis
5013 – Loxostege brunneitincta
5014 W – Loxostege offumalis
5015 W – Loxostege sierralis
5016 – Loxostege commixtalis
5017 – Loxostege cereralis, alfalfa webworm moth
5018 – Pyrausta demantrialis
5019 W – Pyrausta nexalis, fulvous-edged pyrausta moth
5020 – Pyrausta sartoralis
5021 – Pyrausta roseivestalis
5022 W – Pyrausta zonalis
5023 W – Pyrausta napaealis
5024 W – Pyrausta linealis
5025 – Pyrausta ochreicostalis
5026 – Pyrausta pilatealis
5027 W – Pyrausta lethalis, lethal pyrausta moth
5028 – Pyrausta corinthalis
5029 W – Pyrausta volupialis, volupial pyrausta moth
5030 W – Pyrausta morenalis
5031 – Pyrausta atropurpuralis
5032 W – Pyrausta nicalis
5033 W – Pyrausta grotei
5034 – Pyrausta signatalis, raspberry pyrausta moth
5035 – Pyrausta pythialis
5036 – Pyrausta inveterascalis
5037 W – Pyrausta inornatalis, inornate pyrausta moth
5038 – Pyrausta shirleyae
5039 – Pyrausta coccinea
5040 – Pyrausta bicoloralis, bicolored pyrausta moth
5041 – Pyrausta augustalis
5042 – Pyrausta onythesalis
5043 – Pyrausta pseudonythesalis
5044 – Pyrausta insignitalis, dark-banded pyrausta moth
5045 – Pyrausta aurea
5046 – Pyrausta flavibrunnea
5047 W – Pyrausta klotsi
5048 – Pyrausta flavofascialis
5049 – Pyrausta phoenicealis, Phoenicean pyrausta moth
5050 – Pyrausta panopealis
5051 – Pyrausta rubricalis, variable reddish pyrausta moth
5052 W – Pyrausta californicalis, California pyrausta moth
5053 – Pyrausta pseuderosnealis
5054 – Pyrausta dapalis
5055 – Pyrausta homonymalis
5056 – Pyrausta generosa
5057 – Pyrausta subgenerosa
5058 – Pyrausta orphisalis, orange mint moth
5059 W – Pyrausta tuolumnalis
5060 – Pyrausta subsequalis
5060.1 – Pyrausta borealis, northern pyrausta moth
5060.2 W – Pyrausta plagalis
5061 W – Pyrausta tatalis
5062 – Pyrausta retidiscalis
5063 – Pyrausta andrei
5064 W – Pyrausta perrubralis, Shasta pyrausta moth
5065 – Pyrausta scurralis
5066 – Pyrausta arizonicalis
5067 W – Pyrausta semirubralis
5068 – Pyrausta unifascialis, pussy's toes pyrausta moth
5069 – Pyrausta tyralis, coffee-loving pyrausta moth
5070 – Pyrausta laticlavia, southern purple mint moth
5071 – Pyrausta acrionalis, mint-loving pyrausta moth
5072 – Pyrausta obtusanalis
5073 – Pyrausta niveicilialis, white-fringed pyrausta moth
5074 W – Pyrausta fodinalis
5075 – Pyrausta socialis, sociable pyrausta moth
5076 – Pyrausta antisocialis
5076.1 – Pyrausta cespitalis
5077 – Hyalorista taeniolalis
5078 – Portentomorpha xanthialis
5078.1 – Gonocausta sabinalis
5079 – Udea rubigalis, celery leaftier moth
5080 W – Udea profundalis
5081 W – Udea washingtonalis, Washington udea moth
5082 – Udea octosignalis
5083 – Udea vacunalis
5084 – Udea torvalis
5085 – Udea alaskalis
5086 – Udea inquinatalis
5087 – Udea rusticalis
5088 – Udea nordeggensis
5089 – Udea berberalis
5090 – Udea indistinctalis
5091 – Udea sheppardi
5092 – Udea saxifragae
5093 – Udea brevipalpis
5094 – Udea cacuminicola
5095 – Udea beringialis
5096 – Udea derasa
5097 – Udea livida
5098 – Udea turmalis
5099 – Udea itysalis
5100 W – Udea abstrusa
5101 – Udea radiosalis
5101.1 – Udea aenigmatica
5102 – Neoleucinodes prophetica
5103 – Lamprosema lunulalis
5104 – Lamprosema victoriae
5105 – Lamprosema sinaloanensis
5105.1 – Lamprosema baracoalis
5105.2 – Lamprosema canacealis
5106 – Lineodes fontella, eastern lineodes moth
5107 – Lineodes integra, eggplant leafroller moth
5108 – Lineodes interrupta
5109 – Lineodes triangulalis
5109.1 – Lineodes elcodes
5110 – Atomopteryx solanalis
5111 – Ercta vittata
5112 – Apilocrocis brumalis
5113 W – Apilocrocis pimalis, Pima apilocrocis moth
5114 – Diaphantania impulsalis
5115 – Loxostegopsis polle
5116 W – Loxostegopsis xanthocrypta
5117 – Loxostegopsis merrickalis, Merrick's pyralid moth
5118 – Loxostegopsis emigralis
5119 – Loxostegopsis curialis
5120 – Sufetula diminutalis
5120.1 – Sufetula carbonalis
5121 – Microphysetica hermeasalis
5122 – Eurrhyparodes lygdamis
5122.1 W – Eurrhyparodes splendens
5123 – Deuterophysa fernaldi
5124 – Hydropionea oblectalis
5125 – Hydropionea fenestralis
5126 – Geshna cannalis, lesser canna leafroller moth
5127 – Hydriris ornatalis, ornate hydriris moth
5128 W – Choristostigma plumbosignalis
5129 – Choristostigma zephyralis
5130 – Choristostigma roseopennalis
5131 – Choristostigma perpulchralis
5132 W – Choristostigma elegantale
5133 – Choristostigma disputalis
5134 – Choristostigma leucosalis
5135 – Mecyna submedialis, orange-toned mecyna moth
5136 – Mecyna fuscimaculalis
5137 – Mecyna mustelinalis
5138 – Mecyna luscitialis
5139 – Mimorista subcostalis
5140 – Mimorista trimaculalis
5141 – Mimorista tristigmalis
5142 – Diacme elealis, paler diacme moth
5143 – Diacme adipaloides, darker diacme moth
5144 – Diacme phyllisalis
5145 – Diacme mopsalis, mopsalis diacme moth
5145.1 – Diacme oriolalis
5146 – Epipagis forsythae, Forsyth's epipagis moth
5147 – Epipagis huronalis
5148 – Epipagis disparilis
5149 – Sameodes albiguttalis, waterhyacinth moth
5150 – Samea ecclesialis, assembly moth
5151 – Samea multiplicalis, salvinia stem-borer moth
5152 – Samea baccatalis
5152.1 – Samea druchasalis
5153 – Crocidocnemis pellucidalis
5154 – Loxomorpha cambogialis
5155 – Loxomorpha flavidissimalis
5156 – Nomophila nearctica, lucerne moth
5156.5 – Duponchelia fovealis, exotic greenhouse invasive
5157 – Rhectocraspeda periusalis, eggplant webworm moth
5158 – Ategumia ebulealis
5159 – Desmia funeralis, grape leaffolder moth
5160 – Desmia maculalis
5161 – Desmia subdivisalis
5162 – Desmia ufeus
5163 – Desmia divisalis
5164 – Desmia tages
5165 – Desmia stenizonalis
5166 – Desmia deploralis, deploring desmia moth
5167 – Desmia ploralis, mournful desmia moth
5168 – Desmia desmialis
5169 – Hymenia perspectalis, spotted beet webworm moth
5170 – Spoladea recurvalis, Hawaiian beet webworm moth
5171 – Diasemiopsis leodocusalis
5172 – Diasemiodes janassialis
5173 – Diasemiodes nigralis
5174 – Diathrausta reconditalis, recondite webworm moth
5175 – Diathrausta harlequinalis, harlequin webworm moth
5176 – Anageshna primordialis, yellow-spotted webworm moth
5177 – Apogeshna stenialis, checkered apogeshna moth
5178 – Steniodes mendica
5179 – Penestola bufalis, black penestola moth
5180 – Penestola simplicialis
5181 – Antigastra catalaunalis, sesame leafroller moth
5182 – Blepharomastix ranalis, hollow-spotted blepharomastix moth
5183 – Blepharomastix pseudoranalis
5184 – Blepharomastix potentalis
5185 – Blepharomastix achroalis
5186 W – Blepharomastix haedulalis
5187 – Hileithia magualis
5187.1 – Hileithia decostalis
5188 – Blepharomastix aplicalis
5189 – Blepharomastix rehamalis
5190 – Blepharomastix differentialis
5191 – Blepharomastix schistisemalis
5192 – Lygropia fusalis
5193 – Blepharomastix eudamidasalis
5193.5 – Hileitha decostalis
5194 – Araschnopsis subulalis
5195 – Eulepte anticostalis
5196 – Synclera jarbusalis
5197 – Glyphodes pyloalis, beautiful glyphodes moth
5198 – Glyphodes sibillalis, mulberry leaftier moth
5199 – Glyphodes floridalis
5199.1 – Glyphodes onychinalis
5200 – Colomychus talis, distinguished colymychus moth
5201 – Diaphania olealis
5202 – Diaphania nitidalis, pickleworm moth
5203 – Diaphania arguta
5204 – Diaphania hyalinata, melonworm moth
5205 – Diaphania modialis
5206 – Diaphania infimalis
5207 – Diaphania indica, exotic pumpkin caterpillar moth
5207.1 – Diaphania elegans
5208 – Diaphania lualis
5209 – Hoterodes ausonia
5210 – Leucochroma corope
5211 – Omiodes simialis
5212 – Omiodes indicata, bean-leaf webworm moth
5213 – Omiodes rufescens
5214 – Omiodes stigmosalis
5215 – Condylorrhiza vestigialis, the Alamo moth
5216 – Stemorrhages costata
5217 – Palpita flegia, satin white palpita moth
5218 – Palpita quadristigmalis, four-spotted palpita moth
5219 – Palpita kimballi, Kimball's palpita moth
5220 – Palpita gracialis, gracile palpita moth
5221 – Palpita cincinnatalis
5222 – Palpita arsaltealis
5223 – Palpita illibalis, inkblot palpita moth
5225 – Palpita freemanalis, Freeman's palpita moth
5226 – Palpita magniferalis, splendid palpita moth
5227 – Palpita aenescentalis
no number yet – Palpita maritima
5228 – Polygrammodes flavidalis, ironweed root moth
5228.1 – Polygrammodes oxydalis
5229 – Polygrammodes langdonalis
5230 – Polygrammodes elevata, red-spotted sweetpotato moth
5231 – Polygrammodes sanguinalis
5232 – Azochis rufidiscalis
5233 – Compacta capitalis
5234 – Compacta hirtalis
5235 – Compacta hirtaloides
5236 – Laniifera cyclades
5237 – Mimophobetron pyropsalis
5238 – Liopasia teneralis
5239 – Terastia meticulosalis, erythrina borer moth
5240 – Agathodes designalis
5240.1 – Maruca vitrata, bean pod borer moth
5241 – Pantographa limata, basswood leafroller moth
5241.1 – Pantographa suffusalis
5243 – Pleuroptya silicalis, herbivorous pleuroptya moth
5244 – Herpetogramma fluctuosalis, greater sweetpotato webworm moth
5245 – Syllepte diacymalis
5246 – Phaedropsis chromalis
5247 – Phaedropsis stictigramma
5248 – Lygropia tripunctata, sweetpotato leafroller moth
5249 – Lygropia plumbicostalis
5250 – Lygropia rivulalis, bog lygropia moth
5251 – Lygropia octonalis, eight-barred lygropia moth
5252 – Lypotigris reginalis
5252.1 – Lypotigris fusalis
5253 – Diastictis argyralis, white-spotted orange moth
5254 – Diastictis pseudargyralis
5255 – Diastictis ventralis, white-spotted brown moth
5256 W – Diastictis fracturalis, fractured western snout moth
5257 – Diastictis holguinalis
5258 – Diastictis viridescens
5259 – Diastictis robustior
5260 – Diastictis sperryorum
5261 – Diastictis caecalis
5262 – Framinghamia helvalis
5263 – Microthyris anormalis
5264 – Microthyris prolongalis
5265 – Phostria tedea
5266 – Phostria oajacalis
5267 – Asciodes gordialis, bougainvillea caterpillar moth
5268 W – Psara obscuralis, obscure psara moth
5269 – Psara dryalis
5270 – Sathria internitalis
5271 – Bicilia iarchasalis
5272 – Herpetogramma bipunctalis, southern beet webworm moth
5274 – Herpetogramma phaeopteralis, dusky herpetogramma moth
5275 – Herpetogramma pertextalis, bold-feathered grass moth
5276 – Herpetogramma abdominalis
5277 – Herpetogramma thestealis, zigzag herpetogramma moth
5278 – Herpetogramma centrostrigalis
5279 – Herpetogramma theseusalis, herpetogramma moth
5280 – Herpetogramma aeglealis, serpentine webworm moth
5280.1 – Herpetogramma licarsisalis
no number – *Herpetogramma sphingealis
5281 – Pilocrocis ramentalis, scraped pilocrocis moth
5282 – Cryptobotys zoilusalis
5283 – Syllepis hortalis
5283.1 – Syllepis marialis
5284 – Syngamia florella, orange-spotted flower moth
5285 – Salbia tytiusalis
5286 – Salbia mizaralis
5287 – Salbia haemorrhoidalis, lantana leaftier moth
5288 – Marasmia trapezalis, trapeze moth
5289 – Marasmia cochrusalis, marasmia moth
5290 – Conchylodes diphteralis
5291 – Conchylodes salamisalis, blush conchylodes moth
5292 – Conchylodes ovulalis, zebra conchylodes moth
5293 – Conchylodes concinnalis
5294 – Ommatospila narcaeusalis
5295 – Daulia magdalena, glittering magdalena moth
5296 – Daulia arizonensis
5297 – Palpusia goniopalpia
5298 – Maracayia chlorisalis
5298.1 – Sclerocona acutella
5299 – Acentria nivea
5299.1 – Acentria ephemerella, water veneer moth
5300 – Leptosteges xantholeucalis
5301 – Leptosteges flavicostella
5302 – Leptosteges flavifascialis
5303 – Leptosteges parthenialis
5304 – Leptosteges chrysozona
5305 – Leptosteges sordidalis
5306 – Leptosteges vestaliella
5307 – Carectocultus perstrialis, reed-boring crambid moth
5309 – Carectocultus dominicki
5310 – Rupela segrega
5311 – Rupela tinctella
5312 – Rupela sejuncta
5313 – Donacaula sordidella
5314 – Donacaula unipunctellus
5315 – Donacaula tripunctellus
5316 – Donacaula melinellus
5317 – Donacaula aquilellus
5318 – Donacaula pallulellus
5319 – Donacaula longirostrallus, long-beaked donacaula moth
5320 – Donacaula amblyptepennis
5321 – Donacaula roscidellus, brown donacaula moth
5322 – Donacaula nitidellus
5323 – Donacaula uxorialis
5324 – Donacaula maximellus
5325 – Cybalomia extorris
5326 – Surattha santella
5327 W – Surattha indentella
5328 – Mesolia baboquivariella
5329 – Mesolia oraculella
5330 – Mesolia huachucella
5331 – Mesolia incertella
5332 – Prionapteryx yavapai
5333 – Prionapteryx nebulifera, clouded veneer moth
5334 – Prionapteryx achatina
5335 – Prionapteryx cuneolalis
5336 – Prionapteryx serpentella
5337 W – Pseudoschoenobius opalescalis
5338 – Eufernaldia cadarella
5339 – Crambus pascuella
5340 – Crambus hamella
5341 – Crambus alienellus
5342 – Crambus bidens, Biden's grass-veneer moth
5343 – Crambus perlella, immaculate grass-veneer moth
5344 – Crambus unistriatellus, wide-stripe grass-veneer moth
5345 – Crambus whitmerellus, Whitmer's grass-veneer moth
5346 – Crambus tutillus
5347 – Crambus awemellus
5348 – Crambus lyonsellus
5349 – Crambus youngellus, Young's grass-veneer moth
5350 – Crambus daeckellus
5351 – Crambus gausapalis
5352 W – Crambus trichusalis
5353 – Crambus cockleellus
5354 – Crambus ainsliellus
5355 – Crambus praefectellus, common grass-veneer moth
5356 – Crambus bigelovi
5357 – Crambus leachellus, Leach's grass-veneer moth
5358 W – Crambus cypridalis
5359 – Crambus occidentalis
5360 – Crambus rickseckerellus
5361 – Crambus albellus, small white grass-veneer moth
5362 – Crambus agitatellus, double-banded grass-veneer moth
5362.1 – Crambus alboclavellus, white-clubbed grass-veneer moth
5363 – Crambus saltuellus, pasture grass-veneer moth
5364 – Crambus multilinellus, multinellus grass-veneer moth
5365 – Crambus girardellus, Girard's grass-veneer moth
5366 – Crambus watsonellus, Watson's grass-veneer moth
5367 – Crambus sanfordellus
5368 – Crambus braunellus
5369 – Crambus quinquareatus, large-striped grass-veneer moth
5370 – Crambus sperryellus
5371 – Crambus leuconotus
5372 – Crambus satrapellus
5373 W – Crambus cyrilellus
5374 – Crambus harrisi
5375 – Crambus johnsoni
5376 – Crambus sargentellus
5377 – Crambus angustexon
5378 – Crambus laqueatellus, eastern grass-veneer moth
5379 – Neodactria luteolellus, mottled grass-veneer moth
5380 – Neodactria zeellus
5381 – Neodactria caliginosellus, corn root webworm moth
5382 – Neodactria murellus
5383 – Neodactria modestellus
5383.1 – Neodactria glenni
5383.2 – Neodactria daemonis
5383.3 – Neodactria oktibbeha
no number yet – Neodactria cochisensis
5384 – Fissicrambus albilineellus
5385 – Fissicrambus quadrinotellus
5386 – Parapediasia hulstellus
5387 – Loxocrambus coloradellus
5388 – Crambus dimidiatellus
5389 – Fernandocrambus harpipterus
5390 – Fernandocrambus ruptifascia
5391 – Chrysoteuchia topiarius, topiary grass-veneer moth
5392 – Arequipa turbatella
5393 – Raphiptera argillaceellus, diminutive grass-veneer moth
5394 – Platytes vobisne
5395 – Agriphila biarmicus
5396 W – Agriphila straminella
5397 W – Agriphila plumbifimbriellus
5398 – Agriphila costalipartella
5399 – Agriphila ruricolellus, lesser vagabond sod webworm
5400 – Agriphila undatus
5401 – Agriphila anceps
5402 – Agriphila biothanatalis
5403 – Agriphila vulgivagellus, vagabond crambus moth
5404 – Agriphila attenuatus
5405 – Agriphila angulatus
5406 – Catoptria trichostomus
5407 – Catoptria maculalis
5408 – Catoptria latiradiellus, three-spotted crambus moth
5409 W – Catoptria oregonica, Oregon catoptria moth
5410 – Pediasia aridella
5411 – Pediasia truncatellus
5412 – Pediasia browerellus
5413 – Pediasia trisecta, sod webworm moth
5414 – Pediasia laciniellus
5415 – Pediasia ericellus
5416 W – Pediasia abnaki
5417 – Pediasia dorsipunctellus
5417.1 – La cerveza
5418 – Microcrambus copelandi
5419 – Microcrambus biguttellus, gold-stripe grass-veneer moth
5420 – Microcrambus elegans, elegant grass-veneer moth
5421 – Microcrambus polingi
5422 – Microcrambus minor
5423 – Microcrambus discludellus
5424 – Microcrambus kimballi
5425 – Microcrambus matheri
5426 – Microcrambus croesus
5427 – Loxocrambus canellus
5428 – Loxocrambus mohaviellus
5429 – Loxocrambus awemensis
5430 – Fissicrambus fissiradiellus
5431 – Fissicrambus profanellus
5432 – Fissicrambus intermedius
5433 – Fissicrambus haytiellus, carpet-grass webworm moth
5434 – Fissicrambus hemiochrellus
5435 – Fissicrambus mutabilis, changeable grass-veneer moth
5436 – Loxocrambus hospition
5437 – Fissicrambus minuellus
5438 – Thaumatopsis edonis
5439 – Thaumatopsis pexellus, woolly grass-veneer moth
5440 W – Thaumatopsis magnificus
5441 – Thaumatopsis fernaldella
5442 – Thaumatopsis atomosella
5443 – Thaumatopsis floridalis, Floridian grass-veneer moth
5444 – Thaumatopsis fieldella
5445 – Thaumatopsis repandus
5446 W – Thaumatopsis crenulatella
5447 – Thaumatopsis pectinifer
5448 – Thaumatopsis actuellus
5449 – Thaumatopsis solutellus
5450 – Parapediasia decorellus, graceful grass-veneer moth
5451 – Parapediasia teterrella, bluegrass webworm moth
5451.1 – Parapediasia ligonella
5451.2 – Parapediasia torquatella
5451.3 – Almita portalia
5451.4 – Almita texana
5452 W – Thaumatopsis bolterellus
5452.1 – Thaumatopsis digramella
5453 – Tehama bonifatella
5454 – Euchromius ocelleus
5455 W – Euchromius californicalis, California grass-veneer moth
5456 – Microcausta flavipunctalis
5457 – Microcausta bipunctalis
5458 – Diptychophora harlequinalis
5459 – Diptychophora incisalis
5460 – Argyria nummulalis
5461 – Argyria subaenescens
5462 – Argyria rufisignella, mother-of-pearl moth
5463 – Argyria lacteella, milky urola moth
5463.1 – Argyria tripsacas
5464 – Urola nivalis, snowy urola moth
5465 – Vaxi auratella, curve-lined argyria moth
5466 – Vaxi critica, straight-lined argyria moth
5467 – Argyria tripsacas
5468 – Epina dichromella
5469 – Epina alleni
5470 – Chilo plejadellus, rice stalk borer moth
5471 – Chilo erianthalis
5472 – Chilo demotellus
5473 – Thopeutis forbesellus
5474 – Occidentalia comptulatalis
5475 – Diatraea saccharalis, sugarcane borer moth
5476 – Diatraea crambidoides, southern cornstalk borer moth
5477 – Diatraea venosalis
5478 – Diatraea evanescens
5479 – Diatraea grandiosella, southwestern corn borer moth
5480 – Diatraea lineolata
5481 – Diatraea lisetta
no number yet – Diatraea mitteri
5482 – Haimbachia squamulella
5483 – Haimbachia arizonensis
5484 – Haimbachia pallescens
5485 – Haimbachia indistinctalis
5486 – Haimbachia discalis
5487 – Haimbachia floridalis
5488 – Haimbachia albescens, silvered haimbachia moth
5489 – Haimbachia placidella, peppered haimbachia moth
5490 – Haimbachia cochisensis
5491 – Haimbachia diminutalis
5492 – Eoreuma densella, wainscot grass-veneer moth
5493 – Eoreuma loftini
5494 – Eoreuma evae
5495 – Eoreuma confederata
5496 – Eoreuma multipunctella
5497 – Eoreuma callista
5498 – Eoreuma crawfordi
5498.1 – Eoreuma arenella
5499 – Xubida linearella, x-linear grass-veneer moth
5500 – Xubida panalope
5501 – Xubida relovae
5502 – Xubida punctilineella
5503 – Xubida lipan
5504 – Xubida dentilineatella
5505 – Xubida puritella
5506 W – Xubida chiloidella
5507 – Hemiplatytes epia
5508 – Hemiplatytes prosenes
5509 – Hemiplatytes parallela
No number yet – Schacontia themis

See also
List of butterflies of North America
List of Lepidoptera of Hawaii
List of moths of Canada
List of butterflies of Canada

External links
Checklists of North American Moths

Moths of North America
North America